The Black Arrow is a 1948 American adventure film directed by Gordon Douglas and starring Louis Hayward and Janet Blair. It is an adaptation of the 1888 novel of the same title by Robert Louis Stevenson.

Premise
A knight returns home after the War of the Roses (1455–1487) and discovers that his evil uncle has murdered his father.

Cast

Production
In 1947 Edward Small signed a contract with Columbia to make two films, The Black Arrow and D'Artagnan, the Kingmaker, an adaptation of one of the sequels to The Three Musketeers. Only the former was made but Small made a number of other swashbucklers for Columbia.

Filming started 6 June 1947.

The film uses leftover sets from The Swordsman (1948) and costumes and cast from The Bandit of Sherwood Forest (1946).

Reception
Reviews were positive.

See also
 Black Arrow (1985)

References

External links
 
 
 

1948 films
American historical adventure films
1940s historical adventure films
American swashbuckler films
1940s English-language films
Columbia Pictures films
Films based on works by Robert Louis Stevenson
Films set in the 15th century
Films set in England
Films directed by Gordon Douglas
Films produced by Edward Small
Films based on adventure novels
American black-and-white films
Films scored by Paul Sawtell
1940s American films
Films with screenplays by Richard Schayer